Aditya Ghosh is an Indian businessman who worked in aviation and hospitality industries. He was a former president and whole time director of IndiGo.He is also the Co-Founder of Akasa Air with Vinay Dube .

Early life and education
Ghosh was born in New Delhi. He is a son of an Indian Administrative Service officer. He completed his graduation in law from Delhi University. He did his master's from Kirori Mal College in Delhi.

Career
Ghosh started his career in 1997 by joining J. Sagar Associates, a law firm. He later worked at InterGlobe Enterprises as Group General Counsel followed by IndiGo as the President and whole time director. Under him IndiGo got a market capitalisation of 55,000 crore. After ten years, in 2018, he resigned from IndiGo. In the same year on 1 December, he was appointed as the CEO of OYO hotels in India and South Asia. 

In 2020, he joined Fabindia as a member of its board of directors. In 2021, he collaborated with his friend Anjan Chatterjee and opened a restaurant named Chourangi in London. 

In December 2021 he co-founded Akasa Air along with Vinay Dube. The airline began its operation on 7 August 2022 from Mumbai to Ahmedabad. As of February 2023 the airline has 17 aircraft flying to 11 destinations. Dube holds a 10% stake in the airline.

Personal life 
Aditya Ghosh is currently married to Manavi Ghosh.

Awards
Low Cost Leadership Award at World Airlines awards in 2011.
GQ Business of the Year award in 2013.
CEO of the Year award by SABRE in 2013.

See also 
 Ajay Singh, Indian businessman, Chairman and Managing Director of SpiceJet
 Lloyd Mathias, Indian business executive and an entrepreneur

References

Living people
Businesspeople from Delhi
Delhi University alumni
Kirori Mal College alumni
Year of birth missing (living people)